In animals, Rabies is a viral zoonotic neuroinvasive disease which causes inflammation in the brain and is usually fatal. Rabies, caused by the rabies virus, primarily infects mammals. In the laboratory it has been found that birds can be infected, as well as cell cultures from birds, reptiles and insects. The brains of animals with rabies deteriorate. As a result, they tend to behave bizarrely and often aggressively, increasing the chances that they will bite another animal or a person and transmit the disease. Most cases of humans contracting the disease from infected animals are in developing nations. In 2010, an estimated 26,000 people died from rabies, down from 54,000 in 1990.

Stages of disease 
Three stages of rabies are recognized in dogs and other animals.  
 The first stage is a one- to three-day period characterized by behavioral changes and is known as the prodromal stage. 
 The second stage is the excitative stage, which lasts three to four days. It is this stage that is often known as furious rabies due to the tendency of the affected animal to be hyperreactive to external stimuli and bite at anything near.  
 The third stage is the paralytic or dumb stage and is caused by damage to motor neurons. Incoordination is seen due to rear limb paralysis and drooling and difficulty swallowing is caused by paralysis of facial and throat muscles. This disables the host's ability to swallow, which causes saliva to pour from the mouth. This causes bites to be the most common way for the infection to spread, as the virus is most concentrated in the throat and cheeks, causing major contamination to saliva. Death is usually caused by respiratory arrest.

Mammals

Bats 
Bat-transmitted rabies occurs throughout North and South America but it was first closely studied in Trinidad in the West Indies. This island was experiencing a significant toll of livestock and humans alike to rabid bats. In the 10 years from 1925 and 1935, 89 people and thousands of livestock had died from it—"the highest human mortality from rabies-infected bats thus far recorded anywhere."

In 1931, Dr. Joseph Lennox Pawan of Trinidad in the West Indies, a government bacteriologist, found Negri bodies in the brain of a bat with unusual habits. In 1932, Dr. Pawan discovered that infected vampire bats could transmit rabies to humans and other animals. In 1934, the Trinidad and Tobago government began a program of eradicating vampire bats, while encouraging the screening off of livestock buildings and offering free vaccination programs for exposed livestock.

After the opening of the Trinidad Regional Virus Laboratory in 1953, Arthur Greenhall demonstrated that at least eight species of bats in Trinidad had been infected with rabies; including the common vampire bat, the rare white-winged vampire bat, as well as two abundant species of fruit bats: the Seba's short-tailed bat and the Jamaican fruit bat.

Recent data sequencing suggests recombination events in an American bat led the modern rabies virus to gain the head of a G-protein ectodomain thousands of years ago. This change occurred in an organism that had both rabies and a separate carnivore virus. The recombination resulted in a cross-over that gave rabies a new success rate across hosts since the G-protein ectodomain, which controls binding and pH receptors, was now suited for carnivore hosts as well.

Cats 
In the United States, domestic cats are the most commonly reported rabid animal.  In the United States, between 200 and 300 cases are reported annually; in 2017, 276 cats with rabies were reported.  , in every year since 1990, reported cases of rabies in cats outnumbered cases of rabies in dogs.

Cats that have not been vaccinated and are allowed access to the outdoors have the most risk for contracting rabies, as they may come in contact with rabid animals. The virus is often passed on during fights between cats or other animals and is transmitted by bites, saliva or through mucous membranes and fresh wounds. The virus can incubate from one day up to over a year before any symptoms begin to show. Symptoms have a rapid onset and can include unusual aggression, restlessness, lethargy, anorexia, weakness, disorientation, paralysis and seizures. Vaccination of felines (including boosters) by a veterinarian is recommended to prevent rabies infection in outdoor cats.

Cattle 
In cattle-raising areas where vampire bats are common, fenced-in cows often become a primary target for the bats (along with horses), due to their easy accessibility compared to wild mammals.  In Latin America, vampire bats are the primary reservoir of the rabies virus, and in Peru, for instance, researchers have calculated that over 500 cattle per year die of bat-transmitted rabies.

Vampire bats have been extinct in the United States for thousands of years (a situation that may reverse due to climate change, as the range of vampire bats in northern Mexico has recently been creeping northward with warmer weather), thus United States cattle are not currently susceptible to rabies from this vector.  However, cases of rabies in dairy cows in the United States has occurred (perhaps transmitted by bites from canines), leading to concerns that humans consuming unpasteurized dairy products from these cows could be exposed to the virus.

Vaccination programs in Latin America have been effective at protecting cattle from rabies, along with other approaches such as the culling of vampire bat populations.

Coyotes 
Rabies is common in coyotes, and can be a cause for concern if they interact with humans.

Dogs 

Rabies has a long history of association with dogs. The first written record of rabies is in the Codex of Eshnunna, which dictates that the owner of a dog showing symptoms of rabies should take preventive measure against bites. If a person was bitten by a rabid dog and later died, the owner was fined heavily.

Almost all of the human deaths attributed to rabies are due to rabies transmitted by dogs in countries where dog vaccination programs are not sufficiently developed to stop the spread of the virus.

Horses 
Rabies can be contracted in horses if they interact with rabid animals in their pasture, usually through being bitten (e.g. by vampire bats) on the muzzle or lower limbs.  Signs include aggression, incoordination, head-pressing, circling, lameness, muscle tremors, convulsions, colic and fever.  Horses that experience the paralytic form of rabies have difficulty swallowing, and drooping of the lower jaw due to paralysis of the throat and jaw muscles. Incubation of the virus may range from 2–9 weeks.  Death often occurs within 4–5 days of infection of the virus.  There are no effective treatments for rabies in horses.  Veterinarians recommend an initial vaccination as a foal at three months of age, repeated at one year and given an annual booster.

Monkeys 
Monkeys, like humans, can get rabies; however, they do not tend to be a common source of rabies. Monkeys with rabies tend to die more quickly than humans. In one study, 9 of 10 monkeys developed severe symptoms or died within 20 days of infection. Rabies is often a concern for individuals travelling to developing countries as monkeys are the most common source of rabies after dogs in these places.

Rabbits
Despite natural infection of rabbits being rare, they are particularly vulnerable to the rabies virus; rabbits were used to develop the first rabies vaccine by Louis Pasteur in the 1880s, and continue to be used for rabies diagnostic testing. The virus is often contracted when attacked by other rabid animals and can incubate within a rabbit for up to 2–3 weeks. Symptoms include weakness in limbs, head tremors, low appetite, nasal discharge, and death within 3–4 days. There are currently no vaccines available for rabbits. The National Institutes of Health recommends that rabbits be kept indoors or enclosed in hutches outside that do not allow other animals to come in contact with them.

Red Pandas
Although rare, cases of rabies in red pandas have been recorded.

Skunks 
In the United States, there is currently no USDA-approved vaccine for the strain of rabies that afflicts skunks. When cases are reported of pet skunks biting a human, the animals are frequently killed in order to be tested for rabies. It has been reported that three different variants of rabies exist in striped skunks in the north and south central states.

Humans exposed to the rabies virus must begin post-exposure prophylaxis before the disease can progress to the central nervous system. For this reason, it is necessary to determine whether the animal, in fact, has rabies as quickly as possible. Without a definitive quarantine period in place for skunks, quarantining the animals is not advised as there is no way of knowing how long it may take the animal to show symptoms. Destruction of the skunk is recommended and the brain is then tested for presence of rabies virus.

Skunk owners have recently organized to campaign for USDA approval of both a vaccine and an officially recommended quarantine period for skunks in the United States.

Wolves 
Under normal circumstances, wild wolves are generally timid around humans, though there are several reported circumstances in which wolves have been recorded to act aggressively toward humans. The majority of fatal wolf attacks have historically involved rabies, which was first recorded in wolves in the 13th century. The earliest recorded case of an actual rabid wolf attack comes from Germany in 1557. Though wolves are not reservoirs for the disease, they can catch it from other species. Wolves develop an exceptionally severe aggressive state when infected and can bite numerous people in a single attack. Before a vaccine was developed, bites were almost always fatal. Today, wolf bites can be treated, but the severity of rabid wolf attacks can sometimes result in outright death, or a bite near the head will make the disease act too fast for the treatment to take effect.

Rabid attacks tend to cluster in winter and spring. With the reduction of rabies in Europe and North America, few rabid wolf attacks have been recorded, though some still occur annually in the Middle East. Rabid attacks can be distinguished from predatory attacks by the fact that rabid wolves limit themselves to biting their victims rather than consuming them. Plus, the timespan of predatory attacks can sometimes last for months or years, as opposed to rabid attacks which end usually after a fortnight. Victims of rabid wolves are usually attacked around the head and neck in a sustained manner.

Other placental mammals 
The most commonly infected terrestrial animals in the United States are raccoons, skunks, foxes, and coyotes. Any bites by such wild animals must be considered a possible exposure to the rabies virus.

Most cases of rabies in rodents reported to the Centers for Disease Control and Prevention in the United States have been found among groundhogs (woodchucks). Small rodents such as squirrels, hamsters, guinea pigs, gerbils, chipmunks, rats, mice, and lagomorphs like rabbits and hares are almost never found to be infected with rabies, and are not known to transmit rabies to humans.

Marsupial and monotreme mammals 
The Virginia opossum (a marsupial, unlike the other mammals named above, which are all eutherians/placental), has a lower internal body temperature than the rabies virus prefers and therefore is resistant but not immune to rabies.  Marsupials, along with monotremes (platypuses and echidnas), typically have lower body temperatures than similarly sized eutherians.

Birds 
Birds were first artificially infected with rabies in 1884; however, infected birds are largely, if not wholly, asymptomatic, and recover. Other bird species have been known to develop rabies antibodies, a sign of infection, after feeding on rabies-infected mammals.

Transport of pet animals between countries 

Rabies is endemic to many parts of the world, and one of the reasons given for quarantine periods in international animal transport has been to try to keep the disease out of uninfected regions. However, most developed countries, pioneered by Sweden, now allow unencumbered travel between their territories for pet animals that have demonstrated an adequate immune response to rabies vaccination.

Such countries may limit movement to animals from countries where rabies is considered to be under control in pet animals. There are various lists of such countries. The United Kingdom has developed a list, and France has a rather different list, said to be based on a list of the Office International des Epizooties (OIE). The European Union has a harmonised list. No list of rabies-free countries is readily available from OIE.

In recent years, canine rabies has been practically eliminated in North America and Europe due to extensive and often mandatory vaccination requirements. However it is still a significant problem in parts of Africa, parts of the Middle East, parts of Latin America, and parts of Asia.  Dogs are considered to be the main reservoir for rabies in developing countries.

However, the recent spread of rabies in the northeastern United States and further may cause a restrengthening of precautions against movement of possibly rabid animals between developed countries.

See also
Prevalence of rabies
Rabies transmission
Rabies vaccine

Footnotes

References 
 Baynard, Ashley C. et al. (2011). "Bats and Lyssaviruses." In: Advances in VIRUS RESEARCH VOLUME 79. Research Advances in Rabies. Edited by Alan C. Jackson. Elsevier. .
 Goodwin G. G., and A. M. Greenhall. 1961. "A review of the bats of Trinidad and Tobago." Bulletin of the American Museum of Natural History, 122.
 Joseph Lennox Pawan (1936). "Transmission of the Paralytic Rabies in Trinidad of the Vampire Bat: Desmodus rotundus murinus Wagner, 1840." Annual Tropical Medicine and Parasitol, 30, April 8, 1936, pp. 137–156.

in animals